In association football, a ghost goal (or phantom goal) is either a goal wrongly awarded despite the ball not having crossed the goal line, or a goal wrongly not given despite the ball having crossed the line. In an attempt to combat ghost goals, rules allowing goal-line technology (GLT) were passed by the International Football Association Board in 2012 and have consequently been introduced for some football competitions, including the FIFA World Cup, FIFA Club World Cup and Premier League. The video assistant referee (VAR), introduced in 2018, provides an alternative system to GLT, and is cheaper to introduce & operate than the FIFA qualified GLT systems.

Etymology
In Germany, the term "Phantomtor" usually refers to a Bundesliga "goal" awarded to Bayern Munich player Thomas Helmer in April 1994 against 1. FC Nürnberg, as his team scraped to a 2–1 victory. It was an error of judgement by the match officials, as the ball missed the goal and instead went over the byline. The "goal" had direct implications on the outcome of the competition at both ends of the table — had the Phantomtor not stood and the match finished 1–1, Bayern Munich would have ultimately lost out on the league title on goal difference and Nürnberg would have survived relegation by one point — and led to an official objection by FIFA because the German Football Association ordered the result to be annulled and the game to be replayed.  A re-match eventually took place and Bayern Munich ran out 5–0 winners.

The term "ghost goal" in the English language arose from a quote by Chelsea manager José Mourinho, following a 2005 Champions League semi-final second leg against Liverpool, ultimately decided by a single goal by Luis García, awarded by referee Ľuboš Micheľ, but dubbed a "ghost goal" and described as "a goal that came from the moon" by Mourinho. Television replays were inconclusive as to whether the ball crossed the line or not. Micheľ said that his decision was based on the reaction of the assistant referee, who signalled that the ball had indeed crossed over the line, but had he not awarded Liverpool the goal, he would have awarded them a penalty kick and sent off Chelsea goalkeeper Petr Čech for a foul on Milan Baroš instead. After studying a series of still images of the incident, motion expert Dr. Mike Spann concluded that Micheľ had made the correct decision by signalling a goal.

After the 2005 incident, the terms "ghost goal" and "phantom goal" have both been used to describe similar incidents at both club and international level.

Incidents at club level
In 1980, Clive Allen shot a free kick for Crystal Palace against Coventry City, after which the ball rebounded off the stanchion but the referee disallowed the goal as he thought it had just hit the outside of the stanchion. This was shown on Match of the Day on BBC television when it was then transmitted on Sunday afternoons.

A few months before the 2004–05 UEFA Champions League semi-final between Chelsea and Liverpool which led to the term "ghost goal" entering the lexicon, Pedro Mendes of Tottenham Hotspur caught Manchester United's goalkeeper Roy Carroll off his line with a shot from 55 yards out, in the 89th minute of a Premier League match on 4 January 2005. Carroll attempted to catch the ball but spilled it over his shoulder and a few yards over the goal line, before he scooped the ball back into the playing area. Referee Mark Clattenburg and his officials were unable to determine whether the ball had crossed the line and the game finished goalless.

Referee Stuart Attwell awarded a goal to Reading against Watford in an English Championship match in September 2008, although the ball had passed wide of the goal, so that his assistant should have awarded a corner kick; the match finished 2–2. A similar incident happened in a 2. Bundesliga match between MSV Duisburg and FSV Frankfurt, when Christian Tiffert took a shot that hit the crossbar and landed 1.5 metres outside of the goal-line, yet was still awarded as a goal.

Conversely, during an English Championship game in August 2009, Crystal Palace's Freddie Sears put the ball in the net, hitting the stanchion at the back of the goal and bouncing out. A goal was not awarded. This was very similar to the incident that had occurred for Crystal Palace's Clive Allen almost 30 years earlier.

Another incident in England came in a Premier League game between Bolton Wanderers and Queens Park Rangers on 10 March 2012, when QPR's Clint Hill headed the ball in from close range. The ball crossed the line by a couple of yards before goalkeeper Ádám Bogdán was able to palm it onto the crossbar and out. The Football Association (FA) subsequently called for goal-line technology to be implemented as soon as possible. The corner which led to the goal had in fact been wrongly awarded, and should have been a Bolton goal kick, meaning two bad decisions "evened themselves out".

On 25 February 2012, with A.C. Milan leading 1–0 against Juventus, Sulley Muntari appeared to have doubled Milan's lead with a header from a cross by Urby Emanuelson, but the goal was not given by referee Paolo Tagliavento even though the ball had crossed the line before being saved by Gianluigi Buffon; the match ended 1–1. Juventus eventually went on to win the Serie A title that year, beating Milan to the Scudetto by four points.

On 15 April 2012, in Chelsea's FA Cup semi-final against Tottenham Hotspur, referee Martin Atkinson awarded Chelsea a goal resulting from a 49th-minute shot by Juan Mata. Atkinson ruled the shot had crossed the line, although replays confirmed that several Tottenham players had successfully blocked the effort several yards in front of the goal-line. John Terry, the Chelsea player with the clearest view of the "goal" from his vantage point on the ground, admitted uncertainty: "I thought it hit me, if I'm honest. I don't think it did [cross the line], I thought it stayed out, but I've not seen it on the replay."

On 18 October 2013, Stefan Kiessling of Bayer Leverkusen was involved in a ghost-goal situation against 1899 Hoffenheim. He appeared to have missed the net on a header attempt off a corner. He turned away in frustration only to have his teammates come and celebrate with him seconds later. Upon further review, the ball had ended up in the back of the net after squeezing through a hole in the side netting, unnoticed by everybody at the time. The goal was allowed and was the cause of much debate after the match.

On 16 November 2013, Adrian Cieslewicz of Wrexham was involved in a situation of this kind. With Wrexham down 2–0 at Kidderminster Harriers in a Conference Premier game, Cieslewicz burst into the penalty area and appeared to slot the ball into the bottom corner of the net. However, the ball had actually squeezed through a hole in the net, and referee Amy Fearn originally disallowed the goal. After six minutes of consultation, with her assistants amidst protests from the Wrexham players, the goal was awarded. However, Kidderminster took advantage of the delay in the match and scored to make it 3–1.

On 28 November 2015, Ryan Donk of Kasımpaşa was involved in a situation against Galatasaray. With Kasımpaşa 1–0 down at Galatasaray in a Süper Lig match, Donk kicked the ball. It hit the crossbar and then fell to 9 cm inside the goal line. However, referee Halis Özkahya looked at the linesman and disallowed the goal and continued the match, which finished 2–2.

On 26 November 2017, Lionel Messi kicked the ball towards Valencia CF goalkeeper Neto, but it passed by him and entered the goal by several inches. The referee did not see, and the goal was not awarded. The game ended 1–1.

On 17 June 2020, the first day the 2019–20 Premier League resumed after its postponement from the COVID-19 pandemic, a free kick by Sheffield United's Oliver Norwood was carried over the goal line by Aston Villa goalkeeper Ørjan Nyland, after a collision with his teammate Keinan Davis. Although goal-line technology
and video assistant referee (VAR) were in place, neither the systems nor the match officials signalled a goal. Hawk-Eye, operators of the goal-line technology, issued an apology after the game, stating that the view of the cameras was occluded by the players and the goal frame. The referees' representative body Professional Game Match Officials Limited stated that VAR did not intervene because no goal had been signalled to the match officials.

Incidents at international level

1966 World Cup Final

In the 1966 FIFA World Cup Final played in London's original Wembley Stadium between England and West Germany, 11 minutes of extra-time had elapsed and the score was level at 2–2. Alan Ball put in a cross to England striker Geoff Hurst, who swivelled and shot from close range. The ball hit the underside of the crossbar bouncing down towards the line and bounced off the ground before being cleared away by West Germany's defenders.

The England players celebrated a goal, but referee Gottfried Dienst was uncertain if they had indeed scored. He consulted his assistant, Tofiq Bahramov; after a brief conversation in broken English, the Swiss referee awarded the goal to the home team. The crowd and the audience of 400 million television viewers were left unsure whether the ball had crossed the line and whether the goal should have been given or not. England went on to win the match 4–2 and secure their first World Cup and only trophy so far.

Goals in association football are awarded when "the whole of the ball passes over the goal line". German players claimed to have seen chalk dust, which would indicate it was not a goal and that the ball had merely bounced on the goal-line. Those who consider that the linesman made the correct decision cite the good position of the linesman and the statement of Roger Hunt, the nearest England player to the ball, who claimed he saw the ball bounce over the line, and therefore wheeled away in celebration rather than attempting to tap the rebounding ball in.

When Bahramov wrote his memoirs, he stated that he believed the ball had bounced back, not from the crossbar, but from the net, so the further movement of the ball was already insignificant, and not visible for him either so it did not matter where the ball hit the ground anyway. Referee Dienst did not see the scene. Commentators such as Robert Becker of Kicker magazine accused the assistant of bias because the German team had eliminated the Soviets in the semi-final.

In England, Bahramov became known as "the Russian linesman", as Azerbaijan was part of the Soviet Union at the time. Bahramov also became famous in his home land: Azerbaijan's national football stadium was named after him and a statue was built. When England played the Azerbaijan national team in a World Cup qualifier in October 2004—in the stadium named after Bahramov—many England fans travelling to the game asked to be shown the grave of the official, who had died in 1993, so that they could place flowers on it, and before the match a ceremony honouring him was attended by Hurst and other footballing celebrities. In Germany, it led to the creation of the expression Wembley-Tor, or "Wembley goal", a phrase used to describe any shot that hits the crossbar, bounces on the ground and spins back into the penalty area.

There exists colour footage of Hurst's goal, taken from another angle by an amateur cameraman situated in the stands and having a view almost parallel to the English goal line. This film material appears to show that the ball did not cross the goal-line in full.

Bulgaria v Romania at Euro 1996
On 13 June 1996, during the group stage match between Bulgaria and Romania, the ball of Dorinel Munteanu crossed the goal line by about one foot, after which it bounced back. Referee Peter Mikkelsen did not notice and did not award the goal. As a consequence, Romania lost the match 1:0.

England v Germany at the 2010 World Cup

On 27 June 2010, England were playing Germany in the knockout round of the 2010 World Cup in Bloemfontein. In the 38th minute, 53 seconds after Matthew Upson had scored for England, Frank Lampard shot the ball and it hit the underside of the crossbar, resulting in it crossing the line into the goal but bouncing back into the field of play due to backspin (without hitting the net). Neither the referee nor his assistant were in a position to award the goal. Had the goal been given, England would have drawn level at 2–2. Germany, where this goal was given names like "Wembley goal reloaded", "inverted Wembley goal" or "revenge for Wembley", went on to win the game 4–1.

England v Ukraine at Euro 2012
On 19 June 2012, on the final matchday of the group stage of UEFA Euro 2012, the match between England and Ukraine featured a ghost goal by Ukraine's Marko Dević. With co-hosts Ukraine trailing 0–1, Dević's shot was hooked clear from behind the England goal-line by John Terry under the eyes of a fifth official standing beside the goal. However, Dević's teammate Artem Milevskyi was offside in the build-up to the incident, which also went unnoticed by the match officials. The following day, UEFA and its chief refereeing officer Pierluigi Collina admitted an error had been made and that Ukraine had been denied a legitimate goal. Then-FIFA president Sepp Blatter called the use of technology "a necessity".

Serbia v Portugal in 2022 World Cup qualifier 
On 27 March 2021, Portugal were playing Serbia in a World Cup qualifying match at the Rajko Mitic Stadium. After 90 minutes and with the score tied at 2–2, Portugal's Cristiano Ronaldo scored what appeared to be a winning goal in stoppage time; the ball rolled into the post and crossed the line just before being kicked away by Serbia captain Dušan Tadić. Despite replays clearly showing the ball completely crossing the line, there was no goal-line technology or video assistant referee present in the match, and the referee did not award a goal, which infuriated Ronaldo and prompted him to take off his captain's armband in anger. The match finished 2–2 and Serbia would eventually go on to finish top of Group A and qualify directly for the tournament, whilst Portugal would have to go through the March 2022 play-offs in order to seal their ticket to Qatar.

See also
 Scoring in association football
 Video assistant referee
 Goal-line technology

References

External links
Croud footage of the 2005 incident

Scoring (association football)
Association football controversies
Association football terminology